Ernie "Sonny" Coward (27 January 1916 – 5 April 1985) was an Australian rules footballer who played for Essendon in the Victorian Football League (VFL).

Coward was originally from West Perth and along with his teammate Wally Buttsworth had to spend the 1938 season on the sidelines while waiting for a clearance to Essendon. He soon established himself as a wingman in Dick Reynolds's strong Essendon side of the early 1940s and appeared in three consecutive Grand Finals from 1941 to 1943, with a premiership in 1942. The Western Australian was runner-up in the 1944 Essendon Best and Fairest count. A VFL representative in 1945, Coward played a total of 11 finals matches with Essendon during his career.

Tasmanian club Scottsdale secured his services as captain-coach in 1949, after he had played three seasons at Maryborough.

References

Holmesby, Russell and Main, Jim (2007). The Encyclopedia of AFL Footballers. 7th ed. Melbourne: Bas Publishing.

1916 births
1985 deaths
Essendon Football Club players
Essendon Football Club Premiership players
Scottsdale Football Club players
Scottsdale Football Club coaches
West Perth Football Club players
Australian rules footballers from Western Australia
Maryborough Football Club players
Place of birth missing
One-time VFL/AFL Premiership players